Tashchilovo is a rural locality (a selo) in Kupreyevskoye Rural Settlement, Gus-Khrustalny District, Vladimir Oblast, Russia. The population was 496 as of 2010. There are 4 streets.

Geography 
Tashchilovo is located 61 km southeast of Gus-Khrustalny (the district's administrative centre) by road. Shabanovo is the nearest rural locality.

References 

Rural localities in Gus-Khrustalny District